Groß-Umstadt Wiebelsbach station is a station on the Odenwald Railway in the town of Groß-Umstadt in the German state of Hesse. The station is classified by Deutsche Bahn as a category 5 station. The Odenwald Railway running from Eberbach branches at the station towards Darmstadt and Hanau. The station is located in the area administered by the Rhein-Main-Verkehrsverbund (Rhine-Main Transport Association, RMV).

History

The station was opened on 27 December 1870 along with the line to Babenhausen, which was extended to Hanau in 1882. The connection to Darmstadt was opened on 15 July 1871. The line to Erbach was opened on 24 December 1871 and it was extended to Eberbach in 1882. All of these lines and stations were built and operated by the Hessian Ludwig Railway (Hessische Ludwigsbahn).

The station was originally called Wiebelbach-Heubach. Wiebelbach and Heubach are now districts of Groß-Umstadt. The station is located some distance from the two villages that it was named after and was described as standing "in the middle of a green meadow." Between 1984 and 1988, Wiebelbach-Heubach station was served by a long-distance express train between Frankfurt and Stuttgart and it was considered the most isolated station served by express trains in Germany.

The first station building from 1871 is still preserved. It stands opposite the current station building on the Wiebelbach side of the track and was used after the construction of the second station building as a maintenance depot. The second station building was built on the Heubach (eastern) side of the tracks from 1905 to 1910. It is an eclectic mixture of styles with elements of the Renaissance, Art Nouveau and the Heimatstil (literally “home-style”, related to the Swiss chalet style). Both buildings—as well as the entire Odenwald Railway—are protected as monuments under the Hessian Monument Protection Act.

On 10 September 2005, the station was renamed—along with many other stations on the Odenwald Railway—to its current name.

Infrastructure
In the station there is an electronic interlocking, which controls the entire Odenwald Railway.

Rolling stock

The Odenwald railway is not electrified, so it is operated with Bombardier Itino diesel multiple units (class 613). All lines are operated by VIAS GmbH.

Services
The following services serve the station:

Some trains running as Regionalbahn service RB 81 to Darmstadt Central Station continue as RB 66 over the Main-Neckar Railway and the Pfungstadt Railway to Pfungstadt.

Notes

References

External links

 Der Bahnhof in früheren Zeiten

Railway stations in Hesse
Art Nouveau architecture in Germany
Railway stations in Germany opened in 1870
Art Nouveau railway stations
Buildings and structures completed in 1910
Buildings and structures in Darmstadt-Dieburg